Jack McConnell's term as first minister of Scotland began on 22 November 2001 when he was formally sworn into office at the Court of Session. It followed the resignation of Henry McLeish over the Officegate scandal. His term ended on 16 May 2007, following the defeat of the Scottish Labour Party in the 2007 Scottish Parliament election, where the Scottish National Party formed a minority government.  

McConnell entered office amid the aftermath of the Scottish Parliament's first political scandal and suffered fierce opposition.

Scottish Labour leadership bid 
Henry McLeish resigned as First Minister of Scotland and Leader of the Labour Party in Scotland on 8 November 2001 over the Officegate scandal, regarding the sub let of his constituency office. In the resulting search for a leader, Jack McConnell was seen by many political analysts as the likely successor. McConnell had previously contested against McLeish on the 2000 leadership election following the death of Donald Dewar, but lost. Other likely candidates included Wendy Alexander and Susan Deacon. 

McConnell launched his bid to be the next leader and on the 13 November 2001, he emerged as the only candidate to secure the seven nominations needed to run. Left-wing Labour activist, John McAllion, announced his candidacy, however, he only received one nominee from Elaine Smith.  

On the same day McConnell was announced leader-elect of Scottish Labour, he revealed he had an extra-marital affair seven years prior. In a press conference in Edinburgh with his wife, Bridget McConnell, he stated: "If I become first minister, it would be very wrong for my family or anybody else to suffer because my behaviour then is still a secret today. That is why we are now being open about the fact that I did have an affair seven years ago. At the time I made mistakes, including denying the facts publicly and privately".

Although McConnell emerged as the only candidate, he still needed more than 50% of the support of Labour MSPs. On 17 November 2001, he was officially elected unopposed as Leader of the Labour Party in Scotland after receiving the support of 97.23% of MSPs. In his acceptance speech, he stated he was "deeply honoured to receive such overwhelming support" and highlighted that much work still needed to be done "to make devolution a success" and achieve "first class public services".

On 22 November 2001, McConnell was elected by the Scottish Parliament to be the next First Minister of Scotland. He had support of his Labour Party and their coalition partner the Liberal Democrats, following talks over concession for electoral reform for local government elections and the abolishment of university tuition fees. McConnell received 70 votes, defeating the leader of the Scottish National Party (SNP), John Swinney, leader of the Scottish Conservatives, David McLetchie, and Independent MSP, Dennis Canavan, by 34, 19, 3 respectively.

Following his nomination, the First Minister-elect visited London to meet the British Prime Minister, Tony Blair. Then after, McConnell attended Buckingham Palace, where he was issued the Royal Warrant of Appointment by Her Majesty the Queen. On 27 November 2001, McConnell was officially sworn into office as First Minister of Scotland at the Court of Session in Edinburgh. Aged 41, he is the youngest First Minister to be appointed to office, to date.  

As a result of him becoming First Minister, he was appointed Keeper of the Great Seal of Scotland and to the Privy Council, earning the title 'The Right Honourable' for life.

First term; 2001–2003

Cabinet appointments 

Shortly after being appointed McConnell began making appointments to his cabinet. Jim Wallace remained in the post of Deputy First Minister and Wendy Alexander and Ross Finnie remained as ministers. Sam Galbraith and Angus MacKay stood down and Jackie Baillie, Sarah Boyack and Tom McCabe were reshuffled out of government, while Susan Deacon was offered the post of social justice minister but refused the offer and moved to the backbenches. Cathy Jamieson, Mike Watson, Malcolm Chisholm, Iain Gray, Patricia Ferguson and Andy Kerr were all promoted to cabinet.

Domestic affairs

Sporting event bids 
In February 2002, Scotland joined forces with the Republic of Ireland in a bid to host the 2008 European Football Championship. McConnell was initially unconvinced that it was worth spending around £100 million on the tournament, but he later put his support behind the joint bid with the Irish.

Although the bid lost out to Austria/Switzerland, McConnell later supported other attempts to land major supporting events including London's successful bid for the 2012 Olympic Games and Glasgow's bid for the 2014 Commonwealth Games.

Sectarianism 
In December 2002, McConnell launched his government's campaign against sectarianism.

2003 Scottish Parliament election 
McConnell was re elected MSP for Motherwell and Wishaw at the Scottish Parliament elections. The Labour Party in Scotland won 50 seats, the largest number, and formed another coalition government with the Liberal Democrats which won 17 seats.

Second term; 2003–2007 
On 15 May, McConnell was re appointed First Minister of Scotland and on the same day the Scottish government published A Partnership for a Better Scotland which set out the government's priorities for the four-year term ahead.

This was followed by the “Fresh Talent initiative” which was created and developed to focus at addressing the demographic decline in Scotland and ageing Scottish population by attracting young and skilled immigrants, primarily from other European Union countries (such as Poland and Slovakia primarily) to be attracted to Scotland as a place to live and work.

Public smoking ban 
One of McConnell's most famous achievements during his tenure in government was the successful campaign to ban smoking in Scottish public places, such as pubs, public transport and restaurants, making Scotland the first country within the United Kingdom to do so, which lead to McConnell receiving praise for his leadership on this issue, ultimately leading other countries to follow.

McConnell attended the 31st G8 summit which was held in Gleneagles Hotel, Scotland, and welcomed guests invited to the conference to Glasgow Prestwick Airport on arrival.

2007 Scottish Parliament election 
The Scottish Parliament general election of 3 May 2007 saw McConnell re elected as the MSP for Motherwell and Wishaw with a majority of 5,938 votes, representing 48% of the vote with a turnout of 50.3%. The Labour Party in Scotland was defeated by the SNP with the SNP winning 47 seats to Labour's 46, leaving the SNP short of an overall majority in the Parliament.

Resignation 
McConnell left office as First Minister on 16 May 2007, when the Scottish Parliament elected Alex Salmond as his successor. On 17 May 2007, the SNP officially formed the first nationalist administration of the Scottish Government and McConnell became Leader of the Opposition. On 15 August 2007, McConnell announced his intention to resign as Scottish Labour Leader.

See also 

 First McConnell government
 Second McConnell government

References

Notes

Citations 

Scottish governments
Ministries of Elizabeth II
2001 establishments in Scotland
2007 disestablishments in Scotland
Coalition governments of the United Kingdom
Scottish premierships